Roy Bridge may refer to:

Roy Anthony Bridge (1921–2000), Jamaican member of the International Olympic Committee
Roy Arthur Odell Bridge (1911–1978), English banker

See also
 Roybridge, a village in Scotland

Roy Bridges (disambiguation)